George Rossi (28 September 1961 – 5 January 2022) was a Scottish actor, best known for playing Duncan Lennox in The Bill from 1998 to 2003.

Early life and education
Rossi was born in Govan, Glasgow, on 28 September 1961. He was of Italian descent, with his parents originating from Valvori, a commune of Vallerotonda in Lazio, Italy. Growing up, he worked in the family ice-cream van. His brother, Peter, appeared alongside him in the film Comfort and Joy.

Rossi trained at East 15 Acting School in Debden, Essex.

Career
Besides The Bill, Rossi also played Kevin in Roughnecks and appeared in Taggart, Holby City, Boon, Local Hero, The Singing Detective, and Whitechapel.

Personal life

Rossi married Catrin and together they had two children.

Death

On 5 January 2022, Rossi died, aged 60, from pancreatic cancer.

Filmography

References

External links

1961 births
2022 deaths
Alumni of East 15 Acting School
Male actors from Glasgow
People from Govan
Scottish male film actors
Scottish male television actors
Scottish people of Italian descent
Deaths from pancreatic cancer